PLC Mega is the second largest shopping mall in the Baltics 102,000 m2 (1,100,000 sq ft). Mega is in Kaunas, Lithuania. It was built by the Lithuanian company AB "Baltic Shopping Centers" in 2005. The building has a marine aquarium. It is the highest aquarium in the Baltic States. The mall was renovated in 2016, with expansion.

See also 
 List of shopping malls in Lithuania

External links 
 Website (lt, en)

References

Shopping malls in Kaunas
Commercial buildings completed in 2005